is a Japanese politician of the Democratic Party of Japan, a member of the House of Councillors in the Diet (national legislature). A native of Utsunomiya, Tochigi and graduate of Tohoku University, he joined the government of Tochigi Prefecture and was elected to its assembly for the first time in 1984. In 1990 he was elected to the House of Representatives for the first time, but lost the seat in 1996. In 1998 he was elected to the House of Councillors for the first time.

References

External links 
  in Japanese.

Members of the House of Representatives (Japan)
Members of the House of Councillors (Japan)
Tohoku University alumni
1950 births
Living people
People from Utsunomiya, Tochigi
Democratic Party of Japan politicians